WSEM (1500 AM) was a radio station broadcasting a contemporary Christian format, simulcasting WMGR 930 AM Bainbridge, Georgia. It was licensed to Donalsonville, Georgia, United States. The station was last owned by Flint Media, Inc.

History
On January 1, 2017, WSEM changed their format from classic hits to contemporary Christian. Flint Media turned in the station's license for cancellation on December 5, 2019, and the Federal Communications Commission cancelled WSEM's license on December 9, 2019.

References

External links
FCC  Station Search Details: DWSEM (Facility ID: 59662)
History Cards for WSEM (covering 1960-1981)

SEM
Radio stations disestablished in 2019
Defunct radio stations in the United States
2019 disestablishments in Georgia (U.S. state)
Radio stations established in 1963
1963 establishments in Georgia (U.S. state)
Defunct religious radio stations in the United States
SEM
SEM